Albert Mountain VC (19 April 1897 – 7 January 1967) was an English recipient of the Victoria Cross during the First World War, the highest and most prestigious award for gallantry in the face of the enemy that can be awarded to British and Commonwealth forces.

Mountain won his VC while serving as a sergeant in the 15/17th Battalion, The Prince of Wales's Own (West Yorkshire Regiment), British Army.  The citation for his VC reads:

On 26 March 1918 at Hamelincourt, France, when the situation was critical, Sergeant Mountain with a party of 10 men attacked an advance enemy patrol of about 200 strong with a Lewis gun, killing half of them. The sergeant then rallied his men in the face of overwhelming numbers of the main body of the enemy, to cover the retirement of the rest of the company – this party of one NCO and four men held at bay 600 of the enemy for half an hour. Sergeant Mountain later took command of the flank post of the battalion, holding on for 27 hours until finally surrounded.

He was also awarded the Croix de guerre and Médaille militaire (France). His Victoria Cross is displayed at The Prince of Wales's Own Regiment of Yorkshire Museum, York, England.

References

Monuments to Courage (David Harvey, 1999)
The Register of the Victoria Cross (This England, 1997)
VCs of the First World War - Spring Offensive 1918 (Gerald Gliddon, 1997)

External links

British World War I recipients of the Victoria Cross
West Yorkshire Regiment soldiers
British Army personnel of World War I
Military personnel from Leeds
1890s births
1967 deaths
Recipients of the Croix de Guerre 1914–1918 (France)
British Army recipients of the Victoria Cross
People from Garforth